Kargasok is a rural locality (a selo) and the administrative center of Kargasoksky District of Tomsk Oblast, Russia, located on the left bank of the Ob River,  from Tomsk, the administrative center of the oblast. Population:

Etymology
Its name means the bear cape in Selkup.

History
It was first mentioned in 1640. Originally, it was located on the left bank of the Panigadka River, but after the intense deforestation, the Panigadka became too shallow for large ships to approach, prompting Kargasok's move to its present location.

References

Rural localities in Tomsk Oblast